Bad Azz may refer to:
Bad Azz (rapper), American rapper
Bad Azz (album), a 2006 album by Lil Boosie